Pius Okigbo (February 6, 1924 — 2000) was an eminent Nigerian economist from Ojoto village, the present headquarters of Idemili South Local Government Area in Anambra State; he was the older brother of the poet Christopher Okigbo. Receiving his secondary schooling at Christ the King College, Onitsha,  Pius passed his Cambridge School Certificate examination in Grade one in December 1940 with an exemption from the University of London matriculation. In 1941, he admitted into the prestigious Yaba Higher College, Lagos, for a diploma course in arts (1941–1942). Due to conversion of Yaba College into a military base for the Royal West African Force during World War II, in 1942 he was transferred to the Achimota College in Accra, Gold Coast (now Ghana), where he completed his studies in Latin, Greek, history, English language, and literature with a diploma certificate in 1943.

He also earned a Bachelor of Science degree in Economics through private study, after, he  proceeded to Northwestern University, where he earned an MA and Ph.D in Economics. As a scholar, he contributed a great deal in propelling into academic discourse, new methods for solving African economic problems. As an economist with sensitivity to historical changes, Okigbo researched and wrote about the origins, evolution and transformation of major economic policies and was practical in his identification and application of competing theories of development that he thought suitable for the realities of the political economy of Nigeria and Africa. He gained academic acclaim in Nigeria when he published a book on the national accounting standard of Nigeria. He was then appointed as the economic adviser to the governor of the defunct Eastern region of Nigeria.

As an erudite scholar on public finance, he lent his service to public scholarship and policy, he was chairman in a number of Nigerian committees, particularly those dealing with the economic direction of the country. In 1994, as chairman of a committee to probe the activities of the Central Bank of Nigeria, he released a report critical of the government's role in mismanaging 12.4 billion dollars of oil revenues accrued primarily to two special accounts. The panel's report is popularly known as the Okigbo report.

References

Pius Okigbo Citation, Nigerian Merit Award.

External links
NNMA
Pius Nwabufo Okigbo: A Pragmatic Economist and an Intellectual Giant

Nigerian economists
Igbo academics
1924 births
2000 deaths
Christ the King College, Onitsha alumni
Nigerian expatriates in Ghana
Northwestern University alumni
Nigerian expatriates in the United States